Gary John McKay MC (born 1947) is a writer and former Australian Army officer. He was awarded the Military Cross while serving with the 4th Battalion, Royal Australian Regiment during the Vietnam War. He later served as Commanding Officer of 8th/9th Battalion, Royal Australian Regiment between 1988 and 1990.

McKay wrote his first book—In Good Company—in 1983. The book is an autobiographical account of his service in Vietnam. Other books written by McKay include Delta Four: Australian Riflemen in Vietnam and Tracy, about the impact of Cyclone Tracy on Darwin in 1974.

References

External links
Official website
In Good Company - Google books.
London Gazette - Award of the Military Cross.
4RAR Association

Living people
1947 births
Australian Army officers
Recipients of the Military Cross
Australian military personnel of the Vietnam War
Australian autobiographers
Australian military historians